Mariano Andres Cánepa (born 1987) is an Argentine handball player. He was born in Buenos Aires, and plays for the club Villa Ballester. He defended Argentina at the 2011 World Men's Handball Championship, and at the 2012 London Summer Olympics.

Achievements
Argentine League
2015, 2017

Individual awards and achievements
Torneo Nacional de Clubes 2016: Best Pivot

References

External links

1987 births
Living people
Argentine male handball players
Olympic handball players of Argentina
Handball players at the 2012 Summer Olympics
Sportspeople from Buenos Aires
21st-century Argentine people
South American Games gold medalists for Argentina
South American Games medalists in handball
Competitors at the 2022 South American Games